Shqiponjat may be:

Shqiponjat (folk group)
Shqiponjat (Ultras)
Shqiponjat (police unit)